Route 194 or Highway 194 may refer to:

Japan
 Japan National Route 194

Philippines
 National Route 194 (Philippines)

United States
 Interstate 194
 Alabama State Route 194 (former)
 California State Route 194 (former)
 Colorado State Highway 194
 Connecticut Route 194
 Georgia State Route 194
 Illinois Route 194 (former)
 K-194 (Kansas highway)
 Kentucky Route 194 
 Maine State Route 194
 Maryland Route 194
 M-194 (Michigan highway) (former)
 Minnesota State Highway 194
 New York State Route 194 (former)
 North Carolina Highway 194
 Ohio State Route 194 (former)
 Oregon Route 194
 Pennsylvania Route 194
 South Carolina Highway 194
 Tennessee State Route 194
 Texas State Highway 194
 Texas State Highway Spur 194
 Farm to Market Road 194 (Texas)
 Utah State Route 194
 Virginia State Route 194
 Washington State Route 194 (former)
 Wisconsin Highway 194
 Wyoming Highway 194
Territories
 Puerto Rico Highway 194

Great Britain
A194 road in Tyne and Wear, England